Aporosa lanceolata is a species of plant in the family Phyllanthaceae. It is endemic to Sri Lanka.

Leaves
Oblong-lanceolate, acute base, caudate to acuminate apex.

Trunk
Branches slender.

Flowers
They are sessile, very small, and yellow in color; Inflorescence - spikes; trees dioecious.

Fruits
Small, nearly sessile, axillary clusters, globose, two-valved, yellow pulp.

Ecology
Rain forest understory of wet zone.

Uses
Fruit- edible.

References

lanceolata
Vulnerable plants
Endemic flora of Sri Lanka
Taxonomy articles created by Polbot